John Savile may refer to:

Sir John Savile of Shelley and Golcar, MP for Yorkshire (UK Parliament constituency) in 1376
John Savile (died 1607), MP for Newton
John Savile, 1st Baron Savile of Pontefract (1556–1630), MP for constituencies in Lincolnshire and Yorkshire
John Savile, 1st Earl of Mexborough (1719–1778), Irish peer and British politician
John Savile, 2nd Earl of Mexborough (1761–1830), Irish peer and British politician
John Savile, 3rd Earl of Mexborough (1783–1860), British peer and politician
John Savile, 4th Earl of Mexborough (1810–1899), British peer and politician
John Savile, 1st Baron Savile (1818–1896), British diplomat and Ambassador to Italy

See also
John Saville (1916–2009), historian
John Savill (born 1957), Chief Executive of the UK Medical Research Council
John Lumley-Savile (disambiguation)